Bijou Hills is an unincorporated community and census-designated place in Brule County, South Dakota, United States. The population was 2 according to the 2020 census.

The CDP is located in southern Brule County, at the south base of a small ridge known as the Bijou Hills.

Demographics

History
Bijou Hills was laid out in 1875, and named after a nearby mountain range. A post office called Bijou Hills was established in 1877, and remained in operation until 1957.

In 1976, Bijou Hills was designated as a National Natural Landmark by the National Park Service.

References

Census-designated places in South Dakota
National Natural Landmarks in South Dakota